This is a list of national parks in Zambia.  There are twenty national parks in Zambia, although a few of them are not maintained and so contain no facilities and few animals.  Others have high concentrations of animals and are popular with tourists, while two or three are world-famous.

Map

Alphabetical list
Blue Lagoon National Park — a small park in the north of the Kafue Flats west of Lusaka, known chiefly for bird life; one lodge
Isangano National Park — east of the Bangweulu Swamps, no facilities, little wildlife
Kafue National Park — world-famous for its animals, one of the world's largest national parks, several lodges
Kasanka National Park — privately operated, south of the Bangweulu Swamps, one lodge
Lavushi Manda National Park — south-east of the Bangweulu Swamps, no facilities, little wildlife
Liuwa Plain National Park — in the remote far west, no facilities but some large herds of animals
Lochinvar National Park — a small park south of the Kafue Flats world-famous for bird life and herds of lechwe, one lodge
Lower Zambezi National Park — east of Lusaka, offers good wildlife viewing on the Zambezi River; numerous lodges
Luambe National Park — a small park, close to South Luangwa National Park, recovering after previous neglect, one new lodge
Lukusuzi National Park — east of Luambe, undeveloped but with potential
Lusaka National Park — opened in 2015, a small park on the south-east side of the capital city Lusaka
Lusenga Plain National Park — east of Lake Mweru, no facilities, no easy access, little wildlife
Mosi-oa-Tunya National Park (Victoria Falls National Park) — the small park for Victoria Falls on the edge of the city of Livingstone (where accommodation is available), includes a small 'safari park'
Mweru Wantipa National Park — no facilities, neglected, little wildlife but has potential for redevelopment
North Luangwa National Park — this reserve has no facilities and is closed except to specially-licensed tours 
Nsumbu National Park (also known as Sumbu) — once ranked with Kafue and Luangwa, needs redevelopment but has good wildlife potential and offers lakeside game viewing, three lodges 
Nyika National Park — famous for its highland scenery and vegetation rather than wildlife; one lodge, but reached from the park of the same name in Malawi
Sioma Ngwezi National Park — in the remote far south-west, no facilities but some large herds of animals
South Luangwa National Park — world-famous as an icon of African wildlife, numerous lodges
West Lunga National Park — no facilities, no easy access, neglected, little wildlife but has potential for redevelopment.

Administration
The national parks are administered by the Zambia Wildlife Authority, an autonomous body responsible to the Ministry of Tourism, Environment and Natural Resources. This Authority took over from the former National Parks and Wildlife Service which suffered from chronic underfunding. Consequently of the 20 parks, five have never had management or facilities and have very little wildlife: Isangano, Lavushi Manda, Lusenga Plain, West Lunga, and Mweru Wantipa; three have substantial wildlife but have hitherto been left undeveloped as a matter of policy or because a neighbouring park has been favoured: North Luangwa, Luambe, and Lukusuzi; and three have wildlife but have been too remote to develop: Liuwa Plain, Sioma Ngwezi, and Nyika Plateau. Of the remainder, most are in quite good shape, except Nsumbu, which went through a decline due to a lack of transport infrastructure, and the zoological park section of Mosi-oa-Tunya National Park which needs rehabilitation.

In approximate order of importance in terms of wildlife resources, the eight main functioning parks, all with access and accommodation are:
South Luangwa National Park
Kafue National Park
Lower Zambezi National Park
Nsumbu National Park
Kasanka National Park
Lochinvar National Park
Blue Lagoon National Park     
Mosi-oa-Tunya National Park

See also
Wildlife of Zambia
Ecoregions of Zambia

References

Zambia

National parks
National parks